Dragoljub Brnović (Cyrillic: Драгољуб Брновић; born 2 November 1963) is a Yugoslav and Montenegrin retired footballer who played as a midfielder.

Club career
In his country, Brnović played for OFK Titograd, Budućnost Titograd, and Partizan, winning the Yugoslav Cup with the Crno-beli in the 1988–89 season. He subsequently moved to France and joined Metz. Before retiring from the game, Brnović also played professionally in Sweden and Luxembourg.

International career
Internationally, Brnović earned 25 caps for Yugoslavia at full level, from 1987 to 1990, scoring once. He was a member of the national team at the 1990 FIFA World Cup In addition, Brnović represented Yugoslavia at the 1988 Summer Olympics.

Personal life
His younger brother, Branko, also represented Yugoslavia internationally. They played together for their hometown club Budućnost Titograd in the 1987–88 season.

Honours
Partizan
 Yugoslav Cup: 1988–89

References

External links
 Metz profile
 
 
 
 
 

1963 births
Living people
Footballers from Podgorica
Association football midfielders
Yugoslav footballers
Yugoslavia international footballers
Yugoslavia under-21 international footballers
Olympic footballers of Yugoslavia
Footballers at the 1988 Summer Olympics
1990 FIFA World Cup players
OFK Titograd players
FK Budućnost Podgorica players
FK Partizan players
FC Metz players
Örgryte IS players
FC Aris Bonnevoie players
Yugoslav Second League players
Yugoslav First League players
Ligue 1 players
Allsvenskan players
Luxembourg National Division players
Yugoslav expatriate footballers
Yugoslav expatriate sportspeople in France
Expatriate footballers in Sweden
Yugoslav expatriate sportspeople in Sweden
Expatriate footballers in Luxembourg